Tongyang is a town of Shuyang County in northwestern Jiangsu province, China, and is directly served by China National Highway 205. The town, which has 47,500 residents now, was also known as Yinping Town before 2000.

Villages
Tongyang town now has 15 villages:

 Yinping Neighborhood	
 Tongdong Neighborhood	
 Tongbei Village	
 Tongxi Village	
 Tongnan Village	
 Caocun Village	
 Maling Village	
 Chaoyang Village	
 Zhouzhuang Village	
 Wutan Village	
 Dazhai Village	
 Houtun Village	
 Zhabu Village	
 Yaozhuang Village	
 Shanyang Village

References
www.cfguide.com 

Township-level divisions of Jiangsu
Suqian